Novoalexandrovka is a rural locality (a selo) in Berdyashsky Selsoviet, Zilairsky District, Bashkortostan, Russia. The population was 119 as of 2010. There are 3 streets.

Geography 
Novoalexandrovka is located 30 km southwest of Zilair (the district's administrative centre) by road. Berdyash is the nearest rural locality.

References 

Rural localities in Zilairsky District